The Bleeding Tree is a play by Australian writer Angus Cerini.

The Bleeding Tree received the Griffin Award in 2014. The following year the Griffin Theatre Company in Sydney premiered the play, directed by Lee Lewis and featuring Paula Arundell, Airlie Dodds and Shari Sebbens.

Griffin's production received the 2016 Helpmann Award for Best Play. It was remounted for a Sydney Theatre Company season at the Wharf 1 Theatre in 2017.

References 

Australian plays
2015 plays